Mun Seon-hui (born January 13, 1968) is a South Korean voice actress who works for KBS' Voice Acting Division.

Anime television series

1969
 Scooby-Doo, Where Are You (Velma)

1985
 Dragon Ball (Launch, Chi Chi)

1993
 Slam Dunk (Ayako)
 Yaiba (Sayaka Mine)

1994
 DNA² (Ami Kurimoto)
 I'll Make a Habit of It! (Nagisa Shiratori)

1995
 Jura Tripper (Ojou, Doctor, Mint)
 Romeo's Blue Skies (Angeletta)
 Wedding Peach (Noiizu)

1996
 Case Closed (Jodie Starling)
 Duchi and Puku (Duchi's Sister)
 Rurouni Kenshin (Kamiya Kaoru)

1997
 Chūka Ichiban (Mei Li, Shan, Pai)
 Slayers Try (Filia Ul Copt)

1998
 Cardcaptor Sakura (Sakura Kinomoto)

1999
 Digimon Adventure (Mimi Tachikawa, Agumon, Wizardmon)
 Magic User's Club (Nanaka Nakatomi)

2000
 Ceres, Celestial Legend (Aya Mikage, Ceres)
 Digimon Adventure 02 (Iori Hida, Jun Motomiya, Arukenimon, Mimi Tachikawa)
 Hamtaro (Hiroko Haruna)

2001
 A Little Snow Fairy Sugar (Saga Bergman)
 Fruits Basket (Tohru Honda)
 Mahoromatic (Mahoro Andou)
 Princess Comet (Princess Comet)
2002
 Duel Masters (Mimi Tasogare)
 RahXephon (Haruka Shitow)
 Shrine of the Morning Mist (Kurako Hieda)

2003
 Spheres (Teacher Joo Ah Ra, Ang Ga Ra)

2004
 Gankutsuou: The Count of Monte Cristo (Peppo, Victoria de Danglars)
 Ragnarok the Animation (Yuufa)
 Rozen Maiden (Nori Sakurada)
 School Rumble (Tenma Tsukamoto)
 Winx Club (Stella)

2005
 Animal Yokochō (Iyo, Shima Shimako, Ako Aomori)
 Rozen Maiden: Träumend (Nori Sakurada)
 SoltyRei (Solty Revant)

2006
 Kanon (Akiko Minase)
 School Rumble: Second Term (Tenma Tsukamoto)
 The Familiar of Zero (Louise)

2007
 Zero no Tsukaima: Futatsuki no Kishi (Louise)

2013
 Pretty Rhythm: Dear My Future (Mia Ageha)
 Love Live! (Hanayo Koizumi)

Original video animation
 Kirameki☆Project (Kurone)
 Samurai X: Reflection (Kamiya Kaoru)
 School Rumble: Extra Class (Tenma Tsukamoto)

Theatre anime
 Cardcaptor Sakura: The Movie (Sakura Kinomoto)
 Cardcaptor Sakura Movie 2: The Sealed Card (Sakura Kinomoto)
 Only Yesterday (Taeko Okajima)
 Samurai X: The Motion Picture (Kamiya Kaoru)
 Whisper of the Heart (Shizuku Tsukishima)
 You're Under Arrest: The Movie (Miyuki Kobayakawa)

Web anime
 I'm Sorry, I Love You (Yoon Seo-kyung)

External links
  Mun Seon-hui Fan Club

1968 births
Living people
South Korean voice actresses